The 1941 Eccles rail crash occurred on 30 December 1941 at the east end of Eccles railway station in Lancashire, England.

Events
A westbound train  passed danger signals in fog in the wartime blackout and collided at about 30 mph with an eastbound train  traversing a crossover. A major contributory cause was that the signalman had erroneously suspended "fog working", which would give greater distances between trains, due to a misunderstanding about whether fogmen were on duty. The fog was worsened by the nearby Manchester Ship Canal and visibility was as low as 10 yards.

Inquiry
An inquiry into the accident was opened on 7 January 1942.

At the conclusion of the Inquiry the Ministry of Transport Inspector blamed the signalman for the accident. The Rochdale train should not have been permitted to go towards the occupied junction, which was caused by the signalman not observing the block regulations and a confusion over which fogmen were on duty. The driver was also held partly to blame for his speed in low visibility conditions which would not allow him to observe the signals. The Inspector also noted that if the trains had been fitted with an automatic train control system, which had been recently trialled by the LMS in the London area, it would have prevented the collision in the fog.

Victims
Initial reports were at least 15 people were killed and 100 injured; some later died in hospital and a total of 23 people were killed and 57 had serious injuries.

Notes

References 

Eccles rail crash, 1941
Eccles rail crash, 1941
Eccles rail crash
Eccles, Greater Manchester
Eccles rail crash
Eccles rail crash, 1941
Eccles rail crash, 1941
Eccles rail crash, 1941
Eccles rail crash, 1941
Eccles rail crash, 1941
Eccles rail crash
Eccles rail crash
Eccles rail crash, 1941
Eccles rail crash, 1941